Katip Şadi (24 August 1932 – 12 September 2020) was a Turkish kemençe player from the Eastern Black Sea Region in Turkey. He was a "Görele-style" player and he was thought to be one of the best living kemençe players in the Black Sea Region. 

Şadi was born in Derekuşçulu, Görele, Giresun Province, and began playing kemençe at the age of 10. His kemençe tutor was Kemal İpşir. His first LP was released in 1962.

See also 
Kemenche
Picoğlu Osman

References 

20th-century Turkish male musicians
21st-century Turkish male musicians
People from Görele
1932 births
2020 deaths